Family Portrait may refer to:

Portraiture painting 
 Family Portrait (Hals, four persons), a 1635 painting by Frans Hals
 Family Portrait (Hals, five persons), a 1648 painting by Frans Hals
 Family Portrait (Kralj), a 1926 painting by France Kralj
 Portrait of the Family Hinlopen, a 1663 portrait by Metsu
 Portrait of the Vendramin Family, a 1540s portrait by Titian

Photography 
 Family Portrait (Voyager), a February 1990 image of the Solar System
 Family Portrait (MESSENGER), a November 2010 image of the Solar System

Literature 
 Family Portrait (novel), a 1976 novel by Graham Masterton
 "The Family Portraits", an 1813 story in Tales of the Dead

Music 
 Family Portrait (album), a 2018 album, or the title song, by Ross from Friends
 "Family Portrait" (song), a 2001 song by Pink
 "Family Portrait", a 1996 song by Rachel's from Music for Egon Schiele

Stage and screen
 Family Portrait (1950 film), a film by Humphrey Jennings
 Family Portrait (2004 film), a Sundance Film Festival award winner
 Family Portrait (play), a play revived in 1959 starring Ellen Demming
 "Family Portrait" (The Munsters episode), a 1964 episode of The Munsters
 "Family Portrait" (Modern Family), a 2010 episode of Modern Family
 "Family Portrait", a 2006 episode of Brothers and Sisters